Valerie "Bangs" Pablo Garcia-Birchmore (born May 26, 1987) is a Filipino actress.

Early life and education 
Garcia attended Ateneo de Davao University, where she was part of the university's theater and dance groups. While studying for a Nursing degree, she participated in the Mindanao-wide talent search Campus Idols, in 2004, and was awarded a co-hosting stint in ABS-CBN Davao's local variety show KSP: Kapamilya Sabado Party.

Career 
In 2005, upon the invitation of Close-Up, who was a major sponsor of Campus Idols; Garcia joined ABS-CBN's Close-Up To Fame talent search, where she finished a runner-up. In the same year, she appeared as the best friend of Cindy Kurleto's Greta in Daddy Di Do Du. She also auditioned for Let's Go! and the first teen-edition of Pinoy Big Brother, eventually choosing the sitcom over the reality show.

Garcia was a series regular on Let's Go! and its final season, renamed Gokada Go!, where she played the emo chick Bangs. Originally credited using her real name, her character in the sitcom eventually gave birth to her screen name.

In 2009, Garcia played leading lady to Jake Cuenca's titular Palos and appeared in TV shows Katorse and Kambal sa Uma and in films Marino and Shake, Rattle & Roll XI.

In the second season of Midnight DJ, she portrayed Samantha "Samgirl"introduced as the Midnight DJ team's researcher, resident psychic and romantic interest to Oyo Sotto's SamboyGarcia had to leave show upon landing a lead role in Magkano ang Iyong Dangal?, taking over Roxanne Guinoo.

She appeared in the horror films Bulong  and Segunda Mano, both in 2011, and was awarded Best Supporting Actress in the 2011 PASADO Awards for her performance in latter film.

Garcia played the titular character in the period drama psychological thriller Lauriana in 2013 and was awarded Best Actress in the PASADO Awards following year.

Personal life 

Garcia is married to Lloyd Birchmore, together they have two daughters Amelia and Isabella.

Filmography

Television

Film

Awards and nominations

References

External links 
 

Living people
Filipino film actresses
Place of birth missing (living people)
1987 births
Filipino television actresses